Rhinotus purpureus is a species of millipede in the family Siphonotidae. It is found in the Caribbean, Central America, North America, and South America.

References

Further reading

 

Polyzoniida
Millipedes of North America
Millipedes of South America
Taxa named by R. I. Pocock
Animals described in 1894
Articles created by Qbugbot